The Damen Group is a Dutch defence, shipbuilding, and engineering conglomerate company based in Gorinchem, Netherlands.

Though it is a major international group doing business in 120 countries, it remains a private family-owned company.

Damen Shipyards Group is a globally operating company with more than 50 shipyards, repair yards, and related companies − as well as numerous partner yards that can build Damen vessels locally.  Since 1969 it has designed and built more than 5,000 vessels and delivers over 150 vessels annually. With over 30 shipyards and related companies worldwide, Damen is involved in ship construction as well as maintenance and repair activities.  It has a wide product range, including tugs, workboats, patrol craft, cargo vessels, dredgers, superyachts and fast ferries. Product design and engineering are carried out in-house and a broad range of designs are available.

History

Overview 
Damen was established in 1927 in the town of Hardinxveld-Giessendam in the Netherlands by Jan and Marinus Damen. The two brothers ran a successful, mainly Dutch-oriented, shipyard for decades. Over the years they managed to build up a small, but loyal customer-base.

Damen Shipyards Hardinxveld, located about 10 km from the Damen Group headquarters in Gorinchem, still exists today. It is specialised in designing and building workboats, especially 'multi cats' and shoalbusters.

In 1969 Jan Damen's son, Kommer Damen, took over. In addition to building reliable vessels at an affordable price, Kommer Damen had a revolutionary idea: the standardisation and series production of workboats. To make this vision become reality he needed the support of several key suppliers and clients, most of which still maintain a close relationship with Damen today.

World Bank Debarment 
On March 16, 2016, the World Bank Group announced its debarment of Damen Shipyards Gorinchem for 18 months. As stated in a press release on the World Bank official website : "The company engaged in a fraudulent practice under the West Africa Regional Fisheries Program"

The sanction follows an agreement between the World Bank and Damen Shipyards Gorinchem hence a reduced debarment of 18 months, as stated : "Damen has cooperated with the World Bank’s investigation and has taken remedial action, including strengthening its corporate compliance program"

Statistics 

Key figures and statistics for Damen Shipyards Group in/as of 2015 include:

Annual turnover: 2.1 billion Euro

Damen Shipyard Group: 32 yards worldwide
 The Netherlands: 14
 Abroad: 18

Employees: 9,000 worldwide
 The Netherlands: 3,000
 International: 6,000

Annual deliveries 2015: 180
 Tugs / Workboats: 82
 Offshore Vessels: 8
 High Speed Craft & Ferries: 62
 Pontoons & Barges: 10
 Dredging & Specials: 15
 Naval & Yachts: 5
 Stock hulls: >200

Total number of deliveries since 1969:
 6,000 ships

Key Figures Damen Shiprepair & Conversion 2015

Annual turnover (2015) : 500 million EUR

Damen Shiprepair & Conversion: 15 yards in 6 countries
 40 dry docks
 Largest dock 420 x 80 m

Employees: 1,500
 Delivered projects (2015): >1,500 repair, maintenance, refit and conversion projects

Divisions 
 Damen Shipyards Gorinchem — in Gorinchem, an independent member of the Damen Shipyards Group. 
 Royal Schelde; Warship division.
 Amels Division; Superyacht division, based in Vlissingen and part of Damen Group since 1991.

Products

Warships 
 Corvettes
 Frigates
 Patrol boats (Damen Stan patrol vessel)
 Amphibious transport docks
 Joint Support Ship (Karel Doorman class)
 XV Patrick Blackett (X01) (Royal Navy)

Freighters 

 Container ships (Damen Container Feeder)
 Tankers (Damen Tanker)
 Heavy-lift ship (Damen HLV)
 Cargo ship (Damen Combi Freighter and Combi Coaster)

Passenger ships 
 Catamarans
 Ropax ferries —  & MV Legionnaire (2015–2016)

Superyachts 

  (1986)
  (1988)
  (2016)

Customers

US Coast Guard
The firm fixed-price contract for the first ship is worth €88m (US$120m); the approximate maximum value of the contract, if all options are exercised for a total of 34 patrol boats, is €1.5 billion ($2 billion) over a period of between six and eight years.

Canadian Coast Guard
On September 2, 2009, the Ministry of Public Works and Government Services of Canada announced that nine mid-shore patrol ships based on a 'Canadianized' version of the Damen Stan Patrol 4207 would be built by Irving Shipbuilding in Halifax, Nova Scotia for use by the Canadian Coast Guard in conjunction with the Royal Canadian Mounted Police. The Canadian Department of Fisheries and Oceans had originally wanted twelve patrol craft.

Jamaica Defence Force (JDF) Coast Guard
On October 27, 2005, the JDF Coast Guard commissioned HMJS Cornwall, the first of three Damen 4207 vessels (termed County class by the JDFCG). The second County-class vessel, HMJS Middlesex, was commissioned on April 7, 2006. The third and final vessel, HMJS Surrey, was commissioned on June 26, 2007. The vessels are dubbed County class as they are named after the three counties of Jamaica.

On June 25, 2020, the JDF Coast Guard commissioned HMJS Nanny of the Maroons, a Damen FCS 5009 Cutter. The vessel is named after the Jamaican National Hero Nanny of the Maroons.

Hong Kong Marine Police 
The Marine Region of the Hong Kong Police Force is having Stan 2600 patrol boats built by Damen.

Damen Mk I boats were used in Hong Kong and now retired after Keka-class patrol boats were delivered.

Ecuadorian Coast Guard 

In November 2011 the Ecuadorian Coast Guard ordered Damen Stan 2606 patrol vessels, to be built in Ecuador by Astinave.

Vietnam Coast Guard 
Damen Group has already delivered some Damen Stan 4207 patrol vessels for search and rescue missions.

The Vietnam Coast Guard also cooperated with Damen Group to build large vessels with Dutch 
license, such as one offshore patrol vessel 9014, one hydrographic survey vessel 6613, four salvage tugs 6412. These vessels will be built in Vietnam by the Song Thu company.

Trinidad and Tobago Coast Guard 
Damen Group has already delivered 3 of 12 vessels purchased by the Trinidad and Tobago Coast Guard. A coastal patrol vessel (CPV) CG 25, interceptor (vessel) and supply vessels were delivered in July to strengthen border security and stop the illegal flow of guns, ammunition and drugs into the country.

Group Companies

Damen is a large group. Some of the group companies are:

 Amels
 Damen Dredging Equipment
 Damen Marine Services
 Damen Schelde Marine Services
 Damen Schelde Naval Shipbuilding
 Damen Shiprepair Amsterdam
 Damen Shiprepair Brest
 Damen Shiprepair Curaçao
 Damen Shiprepair Harlingen
 Damen Shiprepair Rotterdam
 Damen Shiprepair Vlissingen
 Damen Shipyards Bergum
 Damen Shipyards Cape Town
 Damen Shipyards Den Helder
 Damen Shipyards Galați
 Damen Shipyards Gorinchem
 Damen Shipyards Hardinxveld
 Damen Shipyards Koźle
 Damen Shipyards Singapore
 Damen Trading
 Damen Maaskant Shipyards Stellen
 Damen Shipyards Antalya
 Damen Shipyards Turkey
 Damen Shiprepair Oranjewerf
 Damen Verolme Rotterdam
 Nakilat Damen Shipyards Qatar
 Damen Engineering Gdansk

See also
 Shipbuilding
 Eendracht (1989 ship)
 List of yachts built by Amels BV

References

External links

 
 Amels super yachts
 Damen locations and yards worldwide
 Damen Magazine

 
Defence companies of the Netherlands
Multinational companies headquartered in the Netherlands
Gorinchem
Hardinxveld-Giessendam
Manufacturing companies established in 1927
Vehicle manufacturing companies established in 1927
Dutch brands
Dutch companies established in 1927
Shipbuilding companies of the Netherlands